Albion G. Findlay (August 15, 1880 – July 21, 1959) was an American football player and coach of football and basketball coach. He played college football at the University of Wisconsin from 1902 to 1905 and was named to the 1905 College Football All-America Team as a halfback.  In 1906, he played with the Massillon Tigers and early professional football team of the Ohio League.  Findlay served as the head football coach (1907) and head basketball coach (1907–1909) at the University of Montana. Findlay was also an instructor in geology at the school.

Findlay was born on August 15, 1880, in Aurora, Illinois. He died on July 21, 1959.

Head coaching record

Football

References

External links
 

1880 births
1959 deaths
American football halfbacks
Basketball coaches from Illinois
Massillon Tigers players
Montana Grizzlies basketball coaches
Montana Grizzlies football coaches
Players of American football from Illinois
Sportspeople from Aurora, Illinois
Wisconsin Badgers football players